Heydarabad in Lorestan may refer to:

Heydarabad, Delfan, a village in the Central District of Delfan County, Lorestan Province, Iran
Heydarabad, Kakavand, a village in Kakavand District of Delfan County, Lorestan Province, Iran
Heydarabad-e Marali, a village in the Central District of Delfan County, Lorestan Province, Iran
Heydarabad, Dorud, a village in Dorud County, Lorestan Province, Iran
Heydarabad, Khorramabad, a village in Khorramabad County, Lorestan Province, Iran
Heydarabad, Selseleh (disambiguation), villages in Selseleh County, Lorestan Province, Iran
 Heydarabad, Honam
 Heydarabad, Qaleh-ye Mozaffari
 Heydarabad-e Chenareh
Heydarabad, Honam, a village in Selseleh County, Lorestan Province, Iran